The Afghan Minister of Agriculture, Irrigation & Livestock is the Government of Afghanistan Cabinet officer responsible for managing Afghanistan's agriculture policy.

Among other matters, the Ministry oversees the work of the Helmand and Arghandab Valley Authority.

Agriculture Ministers of Afghanistan

References

External links
Official site
 , August 16, 2016, Afghanistan Embassy Washington D.C.

Government ministries of Afghanistan
Agriculture ministries
Afghanistan
Livestock ministries
Agricultural organisations based in Afghanistan